The Timorese Resistance Archive and Museum is a museum in Dili, East Timor about the struggle for independence from Indonesia.

History
The museum was opened on 7 December 2005. The inauguration ceremony was attended by Prime Minister Mari Alkatiri and President Xanana Gusmão.

Architecture
The museum is housed in the former Portuguese Timor court of justice building which was burnt down during the 1999 East Timorese crisis. The building spans over an area of 1,325 m2 with a 1,165 m2 courtyard. The architect for the renovation of the building was Tânia Bettencourt Correia.

Permanent exhibit 
The main space of the AMRT is occupied by an exhibit entitled "To Resist is to Win," depicting the history of Timorese armed and clandestine resistance to Indonesian military rule. It aims to make the history of the resistance struggle better known, evoking its main moments and protagonists, using modern museological trends and, whenever possible, audio-visual sources. The exhibit is captioned in Tetum, Portuguese and English.

The museum also houses temporary exhibits on aspects of resistance movement history.

Resistance Archives 
The AMRT stores a variety of textual, photographic and audio-visual materials on site. Some of these holdings have been nominated for the UNESCO Memory of the World register.

In 2013, the Mario Soares Foundation developed an online portal sharing much of this archival material. As a result, the AMRT has the country's largest online archive.

See also
 List of museums in East Timor

References

External links 
AMRT archival holdings 
AMRT on Facebook

2005 establishments in East Timor
Buildings and structures in Dili
Museums established in 2005
Museums in East Timor